The Wandering Image (German: Das wandernde Bild) is a 1920 German silent drama film directed by Fritz Lang and starring Mia May, Hans Marr and Rudolf Klein-Rogge.  It is also known by the alternative titles of The Wandering Picture and The Wandering Shadow (USA DVD title).

The film's sets were designed by Otto Hunte. The art directors Erich Kettelhut and Robert Neppach were employed designing models for the production.

Cast 
Mia May as Irmgard Vanderheit
Hans Marr as Georg Vanderheit / John Vanderheit
Harry Frank
Rudolf Klein-Rogge as Georgs Vetter Wil Brand
Loni Nest as Irmgards Tochter

References

Bibliography
 Bock, Hans-Michael & Bergfelder, Tim. The Concise CineGraph. Encyclopedia of German Cinema. Berghahn Books, 2009.
 Kreimeier, Klaus. The Ufa Story: A History of Germany's Greatest Film Company, 1918-1945. University of California Press, 1999.

External links 

1920 films
1920 romantic drama films
German romantic drama films
Films of the Weimar Republic
German silent feature films
German black-and-white films
Films directed by Fritz Lang
Films with screenplays by Fritz Lang
Films with screenplays by Thea von Harbou
Films produced by Joe May
UFA GmbH films
Silent romantic drama films
1920s German films